Estadio Martínez Monegal is a multi-use stadium in Canelones, Uruguay.  It is currently used primarily for football matches and is the home ground of Juventud. Its capacity is 10,000 spectators.

Canelones, Uruguay
Martinez Monegal
Martinez Monegal
Buildings and structures in Canelones Department
Sport in Canelones Department